NK Vihor Jelisavac is a football club from Jelisavac, Osijek-Baranja County, Croatia, currently playing in the third division Treća HNL.

History
Vihor were founded in 1962.

2018–19 season
Vihor were promoted to the 3rd division in 2018 after finishing second in the 4th division. They started their 2018–19 campaign well having invested to upgrade their squad after the promotion, including hiring players from Hungary. Vihor finished in fourth place in the 3rd division heading into the 2018–19 winter break, having six wins and a draw at their home Koreja sports ground.

References

Football clubs in Croatia
Football clubs in Osijek-Baranja County
Association football clubs established in 1962